This is a list of the famous and notable people from Preston, Lancashire, England. For other Prestons see Preston.

A
Sir Richard Arkwright (1732–1792) — inventor of the water frame which revolutionised the cotton making industry in the late 18th century
Fiona Armstrong (born 1956)  — journalist, newsreader

B
Professor Sir George Grenfell Baines, OBE (1908–2003) — architect, pioneer of multi-disciplinary design, and founder of the Building Design Partnership
Roy Barraclough (1935–2017) — actor from Coronation Street
Stephen Barton (born 1982) — composer for film, television, and video games
Leo Baxendale (born 1930 in Preston)  — cartoonist, ex-PCC and creator of Beano strips Little Plum (1953), Minnie the Minx (1953), The Bash Street Kids
Stu Bennett (born 1980) — wrestler also known by his ring name, Wade Barrett
Tom Benson — marathon walker who held six world records
Ian Bibby - Pro cyclist
Holly Bradshaw - Pole vaulter
Angela Brazil — writer of schoolgirls' stories
Hannah Britland, actress.
 Jim Burns (born 1936) — poet, writer and magazine editor

C
Eddie Calvert (1922–1978) — trumpeter, "The Man With the Golden Horn"
Chris Canavan (1929–2013) — television and theatre actor, extra on Coronation Street from 1962 to 2013
Clarke Carlisle - Footballer
Hugh Carthy (born 1994) - Pro Cyclist
Arthur Catterall (1883–1943) — concert violinist and conductor
Belle Chrystall (1910–2003) — actress, born in Preston
Helen Clitheroe (born 1974) — athlete, 1500m and 3000m steeplechase, went to Broughton High School

D
 Joseph Delaney (born 1945) — author of science fiction and fantasy books, born in Preston
Anthony Devis (1729–1816) Half-brother of the artist Arthur Devis.
Arthur Devis (1712–1728) Portrait artist, born and lived in Preston.
Gregory Doran (born 1958) — Associate Director, Royal Shakespeare Company
Tupele Dorgu (born 1977) — actress, known for role of Kelly Crabtree in Coronation Street
Joseph Dunn (1746–1827) — owner of the coal-gas lighting company, the Preston Gaslight Company
Anulka Dziubinska (born 1950) — actress and model

E
 Paul Englishby (born 1970) — film and theatre composer

F
Tim Farron (born 1970) — Leader of the Liberal Democrats and MP for Westmorland and Lonsdale
Sir Tom Finney (1922–2014) — footballer
Scott Fitzgerald - Boxer, commonwealth gold medallist and  WBA International super welterweight title holder
Andrew Flintoff (born 1977) — cricketer
Don Foster, Baron Foster of Bath (born 1947) — Liberal Democrat politician

G
Zara Glover (born 1982) — international ten-pin bowler

H
Susan Hanson (born 1943)  —actress, Crossroads
A.J. Hartley (born 1964) — novelist
George Haydock (1556–1584) — Catholic priest, martyr
James Hebblethwaite (1857–1921) — poet
Mary Ann Hobbs - BBC radio DJ
John Horrocks (1768–1804) — Member of Parliament for Preston
Henry Hunt (1773–1835) — politician, noted for his campaigns that drastically improved the lives of working-class people

I
John Inman (1935–2007) — comedy actor and pantomime artist

J
Phil Jones, footballer

K
Alan Kelly Jr - former professional footballer and Irish international
Kevin Kilbane - professional footballer and Irish international
Ian Kirkham — saxophone player, Simply Red

L
General Sir Percy Henry Noel Lake — first Chief of the Canadian General Staff, commander of the 7th Indian Division and Chief of the Indian General Staff
Mark Lawrenson (born 1957) — footballer turned football pundit
Joseph Livesey (1794–1884) — social reformer and pioneer of the temperance movement in the 19th century
Sir John Francis Lockwood — Master of Birkbeck College, London, 1951–1965, and Vice-Chancellor of the University of London, 1955-1958
Andy Lonergan (born 1983) — footballer at Bolton Wanderers, ex-Preston North End

M
James Mawdsley (1848–1902), English trade unionist
Ian McCulloch (born 1971) — snooker player who reached career highest ranking of #16
Nazia Mogra, Children's TV presenter and senior television journalist for BBC Newsround and BBC North West Tonight News on BBC One and BBC Sport.

N
Ken Nicol (born 1951) — musician and guitarist in British folk rock band Steeleye Span
John Nuttall (born 1967) — British long-distance runner who competed in track and cross country.

P
Nick Park (born 1958) — animator famous known for Wallace and Gromit and Chicken Run claymation
 Stuart Pettman (born 1975) —  snooker player
 Peter Purves — Blue Peter presenter

R
Malcolm Rae, British senior registered specialist in mental nursing/forensic psychiatry, mental health consultant, nursing educator and civil servant
Edith Rigby (1872–1950) — suffragette

S
Robert W. Service (1874–1958) —poet, known for his writings about the Yukon and the Klondike
Ranvir Singh —BBC news presenter and journalist
J. Keighley Snowden (1860–1947), — journalist and novelist
Johnny Sullivan (1932–2003) — British boxer and Commonwealth Middleweight Champion
 Andrew Sznajder (born 1967) —English-born Canadian tennis player

T
Jessica Taylor (born 1980) —singer with Liberty X
Francis Thompson (1859–1907) — poet
John Thomson — actor and comedian

W
John Wall (1620–1679) — martyr and saint
Dick Wilson (1916–2007) — actor

References

Prestonians
People From Preston